The Parkway Theatre, also known as the Rolland Theatre and since 1952 as the Holy House of Prayer for All People, is a historic former theater at 1768 St. Johns Place, at the intersection with Eastern Parkway in Brownsville, Brooklyn, New York, New York.  It was built in 1928 and is a steel-frame-and-concrete building faced in buff-colored brick with terra cotta trim.  It consists of a long and low three-story block along St. Johns Place, with a triangular lobby block fronting a tall, rectangular-plan auditorium block and stage fly loft block.

It was listed on the National Register of Historic Places in 2010.

References

Theatres completed in 1928
Theatres on the National Register of Historic Places in New York City
Theatres in Brooklyn
1928 establishments in New York City
National Register of Historic Places in Brooklyn